Buy the Way was a South Korean chain of convenience stores that are now defunct, after being sold to Korea Seven Co., Ltd. in January 2010. The company was founded in June 1990. A convenience store chain by this name still operates at gas stations in Israel.

History
Originally, Buy the Way was owned by the Dongyang Group, and was called "Dongyang Mart" for a brief time. Then, in 1991, the chain was renamed to Buy the Way. February 1991 saw the opening of the first stores in Shinchon, Seodaemun-gu, Seoul, and Sinchon. By 2005, there were more than 1,000 Buy the Way stores in South Korea. The chain was sold to Korea Retail Holdings in 2005, and finally was sold to Korea Seven Co., Ltd in January 2010. From then on, Buy the Way stores were gradually changed to 7-Eleven stores.

References

 바이더웨이, 2년 만에 다시 매물 나왔지만… - 머니투데이
 ^ 롯데 세븐일레븐, 바이더웨이 2750억에 인수 - 머니투데이

External links
 Official Buy the Way website—

Convenience stores
Retail companies of South Korea
Retail companies established in 1990
Defunct retail companies
1990 establishments in South Korea
7-Eleven
Lotte Corporation